Lethe naga, the Naga treebrown, is a species of Satyrinae butterfly found in the  Indomalayan realm where it occurs from  Assam to Myanmar, Thailand and Laos It is named for the Naga hills.

References

naga
Butterflies of Asia
Butterflies of Indochina